The Victory Leaders is a 1919 British silent documentary film directed by Maurice Elvey. The film portrayed the events surrounding the Allied victory in the First World War.

References

Bibliography
 Low, Rachael. The History of the British Film 1918-1929. George Allen & Unwin, 1971.

External links
 

1919 films
British documentary films
British silent films
1910s English-language films
Films directed by Maurice Elvey
British black-and-white films
1919 documentary films
1910s British films